Gir Gadhada is a town in Gir Somnath district in the state of Gujarat, India. Before 2013, it was a town of Una Taluka in Junagadh District, Now it has become the administrative headquarters for 42 villages when that taluka was created as part of the new Gir Somnath District in August of that year. Newly built BAPS Shree Swaminarayana Mandir is a popular place of worship and spiritual activities here. There is another older Swaminarayan mandir nearby. Other temples in the town are Shree Khodiyar Mandir, Shree ramji Mandir, Hanuman Ji mandir, Shiv mandir and Ganpati temple

Demographics 

According to the 2011 census of India, Gir Gadhada has 1849 households. The effective literacy rate (i.e. the literacy rate of population excluding children aged 6 and below) is 71.28%

List of Villages in Gir Gadhada Taluka
Below is the Revenue records list of forty-three villages of Gir Gadhada Taluka including Gir Gadhada village.

Ambavad
Ankolali
Babariya
Bediya
Bhakha
Bhiyal
Bodidar
Dhokadva
Dhrabavad
Dron
Fareda
Fatsar
Fulka
Gir Gadhada
Harmadiya
Itvaya
Jamvala
Jaragli
Jhanjhariya
Jhudvadli
Juna Ugla
Kanakiya
Kaneri
Kansariya
Khilavad
Kodiya
Mahobatpara
Motisar
Nagadiya
Nava Ugla
Nitli
Panderi
Rasulpara
Sanosri
Sanvav
Sonariya
Sonpura
Thordi
Umedpara
Undari
Vadli
Vadviyala
Velakot

See also 
 Gir Gadhada Taluka

Notes and references

Villages in Gir Gadhada Taluka
Villages in Gir Somnath district